More You Becomes You is the debut studio album by American musician Liam Hayes, released under his stage name Plush on September 8, 1998 on the Drag City label in the United States and on the Domino label in Europe.

In 2012, More You Becomes You was cited as an influence by Destroyer's Dan Bejar.

Recording
More You Becomes Yous songs feature mournful pianos, sweeping arrangements, plaintive emotional confessionals, and delicate vocal harmonies. For the album, Hayes abandoned the electric arrangements of his debut single "Found a Little Baby" in favor of simple piano arrangements and a more raw approach to production, with much of the album being recorded by Hayes on a tape machine installed by his piano. At one point, Hayes can be heard "giggling mischievously as he misses the high notes of a delicate '(I Didn't Know) I Was Asleep'".

Track listing

References

1998 debut albums
Domino Recording Company albums
Drag City (record label) albums
Liam Hayes albums